Philodendron patriciae is a plant in the genus Philodendron native to the Chocó region of Colombia. It was scientifically described in 2010 by Thomas Croat, who named it after his wife Patricia and called it "one of the most spectacular species of Philodendron that he had ever seen". An epiphyte, as it climbs the long, ovate-lanceolate leaves hang down and develop ruffles.

References 

Flora of Colombia
patriciae
Plants described in 2010